L'Esprit d'équipe (also 33 Export, Esprit de Liberté) is a yacht. She won her class in the 1985–86 Whitbread Round the World Race skippered by Lionel Péan.

She had earlier competed in the 1981–82 Whitbread Round the World Race as 33 Export but lost her mast in the Southern Ocean and did not finish the race.

References

Volvo Ocean Race yachts
Sailing yachts of France